The Battle of the Thames , also known as the Battle of Moraviantown, was an American victory in the War of 1812 against Tecumseh's Confederacy and their British allies. It took place on October 5, 1813, in Upper Canada, near Chatham. The British lost control of Southwestern Ontario as a result of the battle; Tecumseh was killed, and his confederacy largely fell apart.

British troops under Major General Henry Procter had occupied Detroit until the United States Navy gained control of Lake Erie, cutting them off from their supplies. Procter was forced to retreat north up the Thames River to Moraviantown, followed by the tribal confederacy under Shawnee leader Tecumseh who were his allies. American infantry and cavalry under Major General William Henry Harrison drove off the British and then defeated the Indigenous peoples, who were demoralized by the death of Tecumseh in action. American control was re-established in the Detroit area, the tribal confederacy collapsed, and Procter was court-martialed for his poor leadership.

Background

The American Army of the Northwest under Major General William Henry Harrison was attempting to recover Fort Detroit and capture Fort Malden at Amherstburg, Ontario during the last months of 1812 and for much of 1813 from the Right Division of the British Army in Upper Canada, which was commanded by Major General Henry Procter. The British position depended on maintaining command of Lake Erie, as the sparsely populated region produced insufficient crops and cattle to feed Procter's troops, the sailors of the British ships on the lake, and the large number of Indians and their families gathered at Amherstburg under Tecumseh. 

Supplies could effectively be brought to them only by water, usually from Long Point near the eastern end of Lake Erie. If naval command of Lake Erie passed to the Americans, they would be able to land an army on the north shore, cutting off Procter from reinforcement from the east.

British armed vessels had maintained control of the lake from the start of the war to the end of July 1813. The United States Navy was constructing its own squadron at Presque Isle Bay commanded by Master Commandant Oliver Hazard Perry. During July, the British under Commander Robert Heriot Barclay kept the Americans pinned down in Presque Isle, but they had to lift the blockade for two days in order to receive supplies. 

Perry was able to move his ships across the sandbar at the entrance to the harbor and into the lake, and Barclay failed to attack them. Perry's superior squadron instituted a counter-blockade of Amherstburg as soon as his vessels were armed and manned, and supplies of food rapidly ran short.

With supplies almost exhausted, Barclay put out to seek battle with Perry on September 10, but Perry gained a complete victory in the Battle of Lake Erie. Perry hastily wrote a note to General Harrison stating: "We have met the enemy and they are ours". Harrison knew that Procter would be forced to retreat, so he ordered an advance. One thousand mounted troops began advancing along the lake shore to Detroit, and 2,500 foot soldiers were carried there and to Amherstburg by Perry's ships once they had repaired any damage received during the battle.

Procter's retreat
Procter had made preparations to fall back to the British position at Burlington Heights at the western end of Lake Ontario even before he received news of Barclay's defeat, and Tecumseh knew that this would remove all protection from the confederation tribes whose lands lay to the west of Detroit. He attempted to dissuade Procter:

Our fleet has gone out, we know they have fought; we have heard the great guns but know nothing of what has happened to our Father with one Arm [Barclay had lost an arm in 1809]. Our ships have gone one way, and we are much astonished to see our Father [Proctor] tying up everything and preparing to run the other, without letting his red children know what his intentions are.... We must compare our Father's conduct to a fat animal that carries its tail upon its back; but when affrighted, it drops it between its legs and runs off.

Nevertheless, Procter could not defend Fort Amherstburg, as there was no food and the guns had been removed from the fort to be mounted on Barclay's ships. He began to retreat up the Thames River on September 27. Tecumseh had no option but to go with him. Procter apparently agreed to a compromise to retreat only as far as Moraviantown, a settlement of Lenape Indians who had migrated from the United States. This was the highest navigable point of the river, so it was safe from outflanking moves by water. Also, some supplies could be brought there overland from Burlington Heights, although the roads were very poor. However, Procter made no attempt to fortify this position.

The British retreat was badly managed, and the soldiers had been reduced to half rations. Procter allegedly left the main body of his army under command of Colonel Augustus Warburton of the 41st Regiment, without orders, while he led the retreat accompanied by his wife and family, the other women and dependents, and his personal baggage. The British soldiers were becoming increasingly demoralized, and Tecumseh's warriors grew ever more impatient with Procter for his unwillingness to stop and fight.

The Americans left a brigade under Duncan McArthur to garrison Detroit and another under Lewis Cass to garrison Sandwich, Ontario. Harrison led the main body from Sandwich in pursuit of Procter on October 2. As they advanced, Harrison's men captured several abandoned boats and a steady stream of British stragglers. They caught up with the retreating British and Indians late on October 4. Tecumseh skirmished with the Americans near Chatham, Ontario to slow their advance, but the Indians were quickly overwhelmed. The boats carrying Warburton's reserve ammunition and the last of the food ran aground and were left behind to be captured by an American raiding party.

Forces

William Henry Harrison's force numbered at least 3,500 infantry and cavalry. He had a small detachment of regulars from the 27th U.S. Infantry and five brigades of Kentucky militia led by Isaac Shelby, the 63 year-old governor of Kentucky and a hero of the American Revolutionary War. He had 1,000 volunteer cavalry under Colonel Richard Mentor Johnson. Most of Johnson's men were from Kentucky, but some were from the River Raisin area of Michigan, all of them spurred on by the slogan "Remember the River Raisin."

Procter had about 800 soldiers, mainly from the 41st Regiment. The veterans of the regiment's 1st Battalion had been serving in Canada since 1803 and had suffered heavy casualties in several engagements in 1813, including the Battle of Lake Erie, where more than 150 of its men had served aboard Barclay's ships. They had been reinforced by the young soldiers of the 2nd Battalion. Most of the regiment's officers were dissatisfied with Procter's leadership, but Colonel Warburton, the next in seniority, refused to countenance any move to remove him from command. Tecumseh led about 500 Indians.

Battle

Procter ordered his troops to abandon their half-cooked breakfast and retreat a further two miles shortly after daybreak on October 5, then formed them into line of battle with a single 6-pounder cannon. He planned to trap Harrison on the banks of the Thames, driving the Americans off the road with cannon fire, but he had made no attempt to fortify the position by creating abatis or throwing up earthworks, and the ground presented no obstacle to the American horsemen, while scattered trees masked the British fire. Tecumseh's men formed a line in a black ash swamp on the British right to flank the Americans. Tecumseh rode along the British line, shaking hands with each officer before rejoining his warriors.

General Harrison surveyed the battlefield and ordered James Johnson (brother of Col. Johnson) to make a frontal attack on the British regulars with his mounted riflemen. Despite the Indians' flanking fire, Johnson's Kentuckians broke through, the British cannon not having fired. The exhausted, dispirited, and half-starved British regulars fired a single ragged fusillade before retreating in disorder. 

Procter and about 250 of his men fled from the battlefield, while the rest of his soldiers threw down their weapons and surrendered. Most of the British soldiers, including Lieutenant Richard Bullock's grenadier company, who escaped the battlefield were on the right of the British line, where the ground was marshy and more thickly wooded.

Tecumseh and his followers remained and carried on fighting. Col. Johnson charged into the Indian position at the head of about 20 horsemen to draw attention away from the main American force, but Tecumseh and his men answered with a volley of musket fire that stopped the cavalry charge. Fifteen of Johnson's men were killed or wounded, Johnson himself was hit five times, and his main force became bogged down in the swamp mud. Tecumseh is believed to have been killed during this fighting.

The main force made its way through the swamp, and James Johnson's troops were freed from their attack on the British. The American reinforcements were converging as news spread of the death of Tecumseh, and Indian resistance dissolved. Richard Mentor Johnson was credited with shooting Tecumseh, though the evidence is unclear. William Whitley, a Revolutionary War veteran, is also credited with killing him. Lawyer and one-armed marksman James A Drain Sr., in his autobiography Single Handed (1927), wrote of hearing from Whitley's granddaughter the family tradition that Whitley and Tecumseh killed each other simultaneously.

Casualties

Harrison reported that the British regulars had 72 killed and 22 wounded prisoners. Lieutenant Richard Bullock of the 41st Regiment, however, said that there were 12 killed and 36 wounded prisoners. More than a year after the battle, British Colonel Augustus Warburton and Lieutenant Colonel William Evans both reported that 18 were killed and 25 wounded. Harrison reported 601 British troops captured, a figure that included the prisoners taken during the retreat leading up to the battle and stragglers captured after it.

The Indians recorded their own casualties as 16 killed, including Tecumseh, although Harrison claimed that 33 dead Indians were found in the woods after the battle. General Procter wrote in a letter dated October 23, 1813, "The Indian cause and ours experienced a serious loss in the death of Round Head." American soldiers scalped and skinned some of the dead Indians in order to acquire souvenirs.

There are conflicting versions of the American loss in the battle. Harrison stated that 7 were killed outright, 5 died of wounds, and 17 more were wounded. Major General Isaac Shelby said that 7 or 8 were killed outright, 4 died of their wounds, and about 20 more were wounded. Participant Robert McAfee gave 10 killed and 35 wounded, while Peter Trisler Jr. said that there were 14 killed and 20 wounded. 

Historian Samuel R. Brown states that there were 25 killed or fatally injured and 50 wounded in Johnson's regiment, and 2 killed and 6–7 wounded in the infantry, for a total of 27 killed and 56 or 57 wounded. Harrison informed Secretary of War John Armstrong Jr. that the only casualties inflicted by the British were three men wounded; all of the rest were caused by the Indians.

Aftermath

The enlistments were about to expire for the militia component of Harrison's army, so the Americans retired to Detroit.

The American victory led to re-established American control over the Northwest frontier, and the Detroit area remained comparatively quiet for the rest of the war, apart from skirmishes such as the Battle of Longwoods and an American mounted raid near the end of 1814 which resulted in the Battle of Malcolm's Mills. American victory at the Thames failed to translate into recapture of Illinois, Wisconsin, and other Midwestern territories, which the British and Indians held until the war's end; efforts also failed to regain control of the Old Northwest and of fur trade routes after the British victory at the subsequent Engagements on Lake Huron.

The death of Tecumseh was a crushing blow to the Indian alliance which he created, and it dissolved following the battle. Harrison signed an armistice at Detroit with the chiefs or representatives of several tribes, although others fought on until the end of the war and beyond. He then transferred most of his regulars east to the Niagara River and went himself to Washington where he was acclaimed a hero. However, a comparatively petty dispute with President James Madison and John Armstrong resulted in him resigning his commission as major general. Harrison's popularity grew, and he was eventually elected president. Richard Mentor Johnson eventually became vice president to President Martin Van Buren, based partly on the belief that he had personally killed Tecumseh.

A few days after the battle, Procter rallied 246 men of the 41st Regiment at the Grand River, reinforced by some young soldiers of the 2nd battalion who had not been present at the battle. The two battalions were reorganized and merged, as the regiment was severely understrength at this point, and the survivors of the 1st Battalion were placed in the grenadier and light infantry companies. The soldiers of the 41st who were taken prisoner at Moraviantown and the Battle of Lake Erie were exchanged or released towards the end of 1814. They had been held in encampments near Sandusky, Ohio, and had suffered severely from sickness during their captivity.

In May 1814, Procter was charged with negligence and improper conduct, though a court martial could not be held until December, when campaigning had ceased for the winter and a senior board of officers could be assembled. They judged that Procter had managed the retreat badly, failing to secure his stores, and also disposed the troops ineffectively at Moraviantown. He was sentenced to be suspended from rank and pay for six months.

Legacy
Three modern battalions of the United States Army perpetuate the lineage of the old 27th Infantry Regiment, elements of which were at the Battle of the Thames.

Order of battle
The following units and commanders of the American, British, and Native American armed forces Battle of the Thames:

Abbreviations used

 MG = Major General
 BG = Brigadier General
 Col = Colonel
 Ltc = Lieutenant Colonel
 Maj = Major
 Cpt = Captain
 Lt = 1st Lieutenant
 w = wounded
 k = killed
 m = missing

American Forces
Army of the Northwest: MG William Henry Harrison

General Staff
Inspector-General: Col George Walker
Military Secretary: Maj William T. Barry
Judge Advocate General: Maj Thomas Barr
Adjutant General: Joseph McDowell
Aide-de-Camp: Oliver Hazard Perry
Aide-de-Camp: BG Lewis Cass

Kentucky Militia
Governor Isaac Shelby

General Staff
 1st Aide de Camp: BG John Adair
 2nd Aide de Camp: Maj John J. Crittenden
 Quartermaster General: BG John Payne

British and Native forces
Major General Henry Procter

British
41st (Welsh) Regiment of Foot:  Col Augustus Warburton
Local militia (composition unknown)

Tecumseh's confederacy
Tecumseh †

Shawnee: Tecumseh
Odawa: Naiwash
Ojibwe: Oshawahnah

Notes

References

Sources

Carter-Edwards, Dennis. "The War of 1812 Along the Detroit Frontier: A Canadian Perspective," in The Michigan Historical Review, 13:2 (Fall 1987), pp. 25–50.
Cleaves, Freeman. Old Tippecanoe: William Henry Harrison and His Time. New York: Scribner, 1939.  (1990 reissue).
Edmunds, R. David. "Forgotten Allies: The Loyal Shawnees and the War of 1812" in David Curtis Skaggs and Larry L. Nelson, eds., The Sixty Years' War for the Great Lakes, 1754–1814, pp. 337–351. East Lansing: Michigan State University Press, 2001. .
Elting, John R. Amateurs, To Arms! A Military History of the War of 1812. Chapel Hill, NC: Algonquin, 1991.  (hardcover);  (1995 Da Capo Press paperback).
Forester, C.S. The Age of Fighting Sail, New English Library, 

Hitsman, J. Mackay and Graves, Donald. The Incredible War of 1812, Robin Brass Studios, Toronto, 1999. 
Latimer, Jon. 1812: War with America. Cambridge, Massachusetts, Harvard University Press, 2007. 
Sugden, John. Tecumseh's Last Stand. Norman, Oklahoma: University of Oklahoma Press, 1985. .
Sugden, John. Tecumseh: A Life. New York: Holt, 1997.  (hardcover);  (1999 paperback).
Zaslow, Morris (ed) The Defended Border, Macmillan of Canada, 1964,  BOBBY

Conflicts in 1813
Thames
William Henry Harrison
Tecumseh
1813 in North America
October 1813 events
Thames